A Waltz by Strauss or As Long as Strauss Waltzes are Heard (German: So lang' noch ein Walzer vom Strauß erklingt) is a 1931 German historical musical film directed by Conrad Wiene and starring Hans Junkermann, Gustav Fröhlich and Julia Serda. It was shot at the Johannisthal Studios in Berlin. The film's sets were designed by the art director Willy Schiller.In the United Kingdom it was released as Johann Strauss.

Cast
Hans Junkermann as Johann Strauss I
Gustav Fröhlich as Johann Strauss II
Julia Serda as Strauss's mother 
Maria Paudler as Lisl Deisinger  
Fritz Spira as Der Lamperl-Hirsch - Hofrat  
Ferdinand Bonn as Drechsler, cathedral organist  
Alexander Murski as Grand Duke Sergej 
Valerie Boothby as Jelisaweta, his daughter
Irma Godau as Die Trampusch - Prima-Ballerina at the Theater am Kärntnertor 
Fritz Greiner as Deisinger, chief baker
Nora Hofmann as Deisinger's wife
Edmund Binder as The Lord Teacher  
Julius Falkenstein as The Lord Critic 
Ernst Wurmser as caretaker  
Dolly Lorenz as cheerful singer 
Ernst Pittschau as groom

See also
Strauss Is Playing Today (1928)

References

External links

1930s biographical films
1930s historical musical films
German biographical films
German historical musical films
Films of the Weimar Republic
Films directed by Conrad Wiene
Films set in the 19th century
Films set in Vienna
Films about classical music and musicians
Films about composers
German black-and-white films
Remakes of German films
Sound film remakes of silent films
Films shot at Johannisthal Studios
Cultural depictions of Johann Strauss I
Cultural depictions of Johann Strauss II
1930s German films